Roerich is a crater on Mercury, near the south pole. Its name was adopted by the International Astronomical Union in 2013, after the Russian painter Nicholas Roerich.

To the immediate north of Roerich is Lovecraft crater.  Beyond it is Chao Meng-Fu crater, at the south pole.

References

Impact craters on Mercury